Phosphor is the first studio album released by the Neue Deutsche Härte band Unheilig, released on March 19, 2001. All of the artwork for the album is taken from the music video for the song "Sage Ja!". This is the only album by Unheilig with songs sung in English with the exception of a few singles, EPs, remixes and covers.

In July 2009, Phosphor was re-released with new artwork and a remastered audio track.

Track listing 
 "Die Macht" ("The Power") - 4:05
 "Willenlos"  ("Will-Less") - 3:51
 "Ikarus" - 3:25
 "Sage Ja!" ("Say Yes!") - 4:03
 "Armageddon" - 4:02
 "My Bride Has Gone" - 3:51
 "Komm zu mir"  ("Come to Me")  - 3:58
 "Close Your Eyes" - 4:03
 "The Bad and the Beautiful" - 4:04
 "Discover the World" - 3:41
 "Skin" - 3:36
 "Stark"  ("Strong")  - 8:37

References

2001 debut albums
Unheilig albums
German-language albums